Štadión Petržalka (also called (Štadión) za Starým mostom) was a football stadium in Bratislava, Slovakia, in the borough of Petržalka. It is the former home ground of MFK Petržalka. Demolished in October 2012, The stadium had 9,000 places.

History

First pitch 
The first sample football match of Pozsonyi Torna Egyesület (PTE) was announced to be played on 25 September 1898, but due to the tragic matters in the Emperors' family (Elisabeth of Bavaria died on 10 September 1898) was postponed to 2 October 1898. The rules of the game were explained to the audience before the match in October. The match was played between members of PTE in both teams at the Ligetfalu highschool playground. There was no regular football pitch in Pressburg at that time, so PTE used the plain terrain to play its home matches in the beginning years.

Štadión za Starým mostom (PTE stadium) 
During the extra ordinary club meeting on 29 September 1899 the decision to build the regular pitch for PTE nearby to the Danube river, railway to the Wien and City Park was made. The stadium was built at the end of the 19th century for PTE in a year. The grand opening of the new stadium was officially on 25 September 1900. PTE won the match against Magyar Football Club Budapest 3–2, the first PTEs' win ever against the team from Budapest. This stadium was used for Bratislava regional championship until the stadium for I. Čsl. ŠK Bratislava was built in the end of the 1920s. More than 100 years later Artmedia still used to play their home matches at the same place – named Štadión za Starým mostom.

The pitch at the place of the stadium has been there for more than a hundred years. Even before World War II, the stadium was the venue of several international matches. Although destroyed during the war, new stand soon arose from the ruins of the old one and the stadium started to resemble its current look. Major changes have occurred in last ten years, following improvements in Artmedia's footballing results. Stands behind goals were totally reconstructed and a new one was built along the pitch.

Today's estimated capacity is 10,000; it is however impossible to give the exact value, because older part of the stadium still remains for standing visitors. The average attendance of league matches at this stadium is floating above 4,000, one of the highest in Slovakia. However, the stadium does not meet some of the UEFA criteria, therefore the club has been forced to play its international matches elsewhere. Notably, they played their 2005–06 UEFA Champions League campaign at Tehelné pole, home venue of crosstown rivals Slovan Bratislava.
Stadium was closed in 2009 and demolished 2012.

References

Defunct football venues in Slovakia
Sport in Bratislava
Buildings and structures in Bratislava
Sports venues completed in 1990
Sports venues demolished in 2012
Demolished buildings and structures in Slovakia